Henry Aurad (born 20 July 1984) is a Colombian professional boxer.

Professional career
On April 10, 2010 Aurad lost to undefeated Antonio Lozada, Jr. by T.K.O. at 2:10 of the second round. This bout was for the WBC FECARBOX light welterweight title and was televised on Televisa.

Personal life
Aurad also works as an actor, appearing in television series such as Sin senos sí hay paraíso and Tres Golpes. He received his degree from Politécnico Grancolombiano.

References

External links

Sportspeople from Cartagena, Colombia
Welterweight boxers
1984 births
Living people
Colombian male boxers